Microcolona transennata is a moth in the family Elachistidae. It is found in Brazil (Para) and Peru.

The wingspan is 7–8 mm. The forewings are dark purple-fuscous, the bases of the scales ochreous-whitish. There is an ochreous-yellowish elongate spot in the disc at one-fourth, preceded by a blackish tuft. The stigmata is represented by blackish tufts. The plical is placed obliquely before the first discal and is partially edged with ochreous-yellowish. A transverse tuft extends from the second discal to the tornus and there is an ochreous-yellow streak from the costa before the middle just beneath the costa at two-thirds, followed by an oblique wedge-shaped ochreous-yellow mark from the costa. There is an ochreous-yellow line along the posterior part of the fold and an ochreous-yellow dot towards the apex and two or three variable dots or marks in the apical area. The hindwings are dark grey.

References

Moths described in 1922
Microcolona
Moths of South America